Hawaii Route 37 is a  road on the island of Maui in Maui County, Hawaii, United States.

Route description
Route 37's northern terminus is with Route 36, where it heads eastward as Haleakala Highway. At the junction with Route 377, it becomes the Kula Highway, until its southern terminus with Route 31. A short 1.6 mile section of the Kula Highway between Thompson and Kamaole Roads is also called Ulupalakua Road.

Major intersections

See also

 List of state highways in Hawaii
 List of highways numbered 37

References

External links

0037
Transportation in Maui County, Hawaii